Patty Rivard Schachtner (born 1960) is an American first responder and politician.  A Democrat, she served in the Wisconsin State Senate from 2018 through 2020 representing the 10th senatorial district. The 10th district comprises several counties in northwestern Wisconsin and in the Twin Cities exurbs.  Schachtner is a former member of the Star Prairie Town Board, former St. Croix County Medical Examiner, and a former member of the Somerset School Board

Early life and career 
Schachtner was raised on a St. Croix County farm. Schachtner was elected to the Senate in a special election following the appointment of Sheila Harsdorf as secretary of the Wisconsin Department of Agriculture, Trade, and Consumer Protection. On January 16, 2018, she defeated Republican nominee Adam M. Jarchow, a serving state legislator, by a large margin, in a district that Donald Trump had won in 2016 by over 17 points in an election mired by very low turnout.

Schachtner serves on the board of her local food pantry and sits on the board of directors for "Turning Point Wisconsin," a center for victims of sexual and domestic violence.

In the 2020 election, Schachtner lost her bid for election to a full term to Assemblyman Rob Stafsholt by a twenty-point margin.

Wisconsin Senate (2018-2021)

Committee assignments
 Committee on Agriculture, Small Business and Tourism
 Committee on Sporting Heritage, Mining and Forestry
 Committee on Universities and Technical Colleges

References 

Democratic Party Wisconsin state senators
Medical examiners
Wisconsin city council members
School board members in Wisconsin
Women state legislators in Wisconsin
People from St. Croix County, Wisconsin
Farmers from Wisconsin
21st-century American politicians
21st-century American women politicians
1960 births
Living people
Women city councillors in Wisconsin
2020 United States presidential electors
Date of birth missing (living people)